Westgarth railway station is located on the Hurstbridge line in Victoria, Australia. It serves the north-eastern Melbourne suburb of Northcote, and opened on 8 May 1888 as Westgarth Street. It was renamed Northcote South on 1 August 1888, and Westgarth on 10 December 1906.

History
Opening on 8 May 1888, when a railway line between Collingwood and Heidelberg was provided, Westgarth station, like the locality itself, was named after William Westgarth, merchant, historian and a member of both the New South Wales Legislative Council and the Victorian Legislative Council.

In 1912, duplication of the line was provided between Westgarth and Alphington.

In 1968, boom barriers replaced interlocked gates at the Westgarth Street level crossing, located at the up end of the station. The signal box for the level crossing was also abolished at that time.

During 2008-2009, the single track between Westgarth and Clifton Hill was duplicated, and included a second bridge over the Merri Creek. On 27 January 2009, the duplicated track and bridge opened.

Platforms and services
Westgarth has two side platforms. It is served by Hurstbridge line trains.

Platform 1:
  all stations and limited express services to Flinders Street

Platform 2:
  all stations and limited express services to Macleod, Greensborough, Eltham and Hurstbridge

Transport links
Kinetic Melbourne operates two routes via Westgarth station, under contract to Public Transport Victoria:
 : Queen Street (Melbourne CBD) – La Trobe University Bundoora Campus
 : Queen Street (Melbourne CBD) – Northland Shopping Centre

Moonee Valley Coaches operates one route to and from Westgarth station, under contract to Public Transport Victoria:
 : to Moonee Ponds Junction

Yarra Trams operates one route via Westgarth station:
 : Bundoora RMIT – Waterfront City (Docklands)

References

External links
 Melway map at street-directory.com.au

Railway stations in Melbourne
Railway stations in Australia opened in 1888
Railway stations in the City of Darebin